Blips is a British comedy children's television series from Ragdoll Productions, which first aired on CITV (on the ITV Network) on 29 September 2005. It starred Robin Stevens as Mr. Perfect and Patricia Routledge as the narrator. The 26 episodes were written by Alan Dapre & Robin Stevens. Since 2009, the show has been difficult to find, due to it not getting a home media release of any kind, and has been regarded as lost. The show features the 3D animated 'Blips' (a group of purple blobs that wreak havoc in each episode) characters alongside the main protagonist Mr Perfect.

Plot
In every episode, Mr. Perfect would aim to show the viewers how to perform a job or task perfectly. These are ranged from serving ice cream or using exercising equipment. Once it is all done, the blips would rewind the footage before the narrator would say he was perfect at the job and start all over again. This time, the blips would ruin Mr. Perfect's work progress by setting traps or tampering with machines to make them go wrong. After this, Perfect would give up on doing the job or task, and the show would cut to the credits, with Perfect relaxing with a cup of tea and walking home.

Characters

Mr. Perfect
Portrayed by Robin Stevens, he is depicted as an everyman with an overly optimistic, goofy manner. He seems to be mute, using body language to communicate. His attire varies across each episode to fit the situation, but his main outfit consists of thick-framed glasses, tidy hair and a bright blue suit. Not much else is known about him. He lives in a white house where the Blips live.

The Blips
Purple-coloured alien-like beings that can take on various sizes and shapes. They live in Mr. Perfect’s house. A recurring comedic theme in the show is Perfect becoming suspicious of their existence due to the mishaps they cause, but never actually encountering them.

Broadcast 
The first episode was broadcast on CITV in 2005, with reruns occurring spontaneously even after the final episode was produced until 2009.

Episodes

Season 1
 Princess
 Popstar
 Knight
 Cowboy
 Cleaner
 Gardener
 Potter
 Shopkeeper
 Hairdresser
 Movie Star
 Car Washer
 Artist
 Cake Baker
 Golfer
 Waiter
 Decorator
 Keep Fit Instructor
 Tailor
 Ice Cream Maker
 Builder
 Hiker
 Fashion Model
 Shed Builder
 Show Jumper
 Detective
 Pirate

References 

 "Blips (partially found Spanish-British children's TV show; 2004-2009) - The Lost Media Wiki". lostmediawiki.com. Retrieved 12 July 2019.
 "CITV: Blips". web.archive.org. 25 October 2007. Retrieved 12 July 2019.

2000s British children's television series
2005 British television series debuts
2006 British television series endings
ITV children's television shows
British preschool education television series
Television series by DHX Media
Television series by Ragdoll Productions
British television series with live action and animation
2000s preschool education television series